Sultan Qaboos University, located in Al Seeb in the Muscat Governorate, is one of the two public universities in the Sultanate of Oman.

Most students entering the university are selected based on their performance in high school final examinations. Student enrollment has grown from 500 in 1986 to more than 10,000 in 2005. More than half of the students live off campus due to space constraints. It currently has around 15,357 students of which 7,942 are female students and 7,415 are male students. The university contains 9 colleges which are:

 Agricultural and Marine Sciences
 Art and Social Sciences
 Economics and Political Science
 Education
 Engineering
 Law
 Nursing
 Medicine and Health Science
 Science

Notable faculty

 Dawn Chatty, anthropologist, associate professor from 1988 to 1994
 Jokha al-Harthi, writer
 Abdul Jerri, mathematician
 Jackie Spinner, journalist, worked for the Washington Post from 1995 to 2009
 Stanisław Świerczkowski, mathematician, 1986 to 1997

Notable alumni 

 Ahmed Al-Harrasi, is an Omani scientist and a professor of organic chemistry.
 Azza Al Ismaili, is an Omani politician and entrepreneur. 
 Aisha bint Khalfan bin Jameel, is regarded as the first woman minister of Oman.
 Rumaitha Al Busaidi, is an Omani climate change activist.
 Lujaina Mohsin Darwish,  is an Omani politician.

Ranking

Sultan Qaboos University (SQU) is ranked number 1 in Oman. SQU is ranked at number 379 in the world's top universities ranking by the London-based Quacquarelli Symonds (QS).

The university is also ranked number 10 in the QS Arab Region 2019 ranking, and also placed in the 151-200 bracket in the QS Subject Matter Ranking.

See also 

 List of universities and colleges in Oman
 Sultan Qaboos University Library

References

External links

 
1986 establishments in Oman
Educational institutions established in 1986
Universities in Oman
Universities and colleges in Muscat, Oman
Organizations based in Oman with royal patronage